Begum Gul Bakaoli Sarfarosh (Urdu: بیگم گل بکاولی سرفروش) is the third studio album released by the Pakistani rock band Noori. The album was released on 9 October 2015 through a three-day album launch tour in the cities of Lahore, Karachi, and Islamabad (respectively). The album was released in Peshawar on 22 November 2015 where Noori performed for its promotion. Additionally, the album was made available through music streaming service Patari.pk as a free Patari exclusive. The album was preceded by a music video for "Aik tha Badshah" using a more electronica-influenced mix than the version eventually used on the album.

Track listing
All songs composed by Ali Noor, except where noted.

Personnel
All information is taken from the CD.

Noori
 Ali Noor: lead vocals, lead guitar, synth programming
 Ali Hamza: bass, lead vocals

Additional musicians
 Kami Paul: drums
 Hassan Omer: co-producer, additional synth and drums programming
 Shiraz Uppal: Mastering and mixing

References

2015 albums
Noori albums